Exuperius (Exsuperius, Exupéry, Essuperio) may refer to:

St. Exuperius (Exupéry, Soupire), a bishop of Toulouse  
St. Exuperius (Theban Legion), one of the members of the Theban Legion  
St. Exuperius of Bayeux, a bishop of Bayeux
Exuperius and Zoe, martyrs
Exuperius (moth), a genus of snout moths

See also
Expeditus
Exuperantius